The water privatisation in England and Wales involved the transfer of the provision of water and wastewater services in England and Wales from the state to the private sector in 1989, through the sale of the ten regional water authorities (RWA). The potable water supply as well as the sewerage and sewage disposal functions of each RWA were transferred to privately-owned companies.

Background

At the beginning of the 19th century, most water works in the UK were built, owned, and operated by private companies. The introduction of various parliamentary regulations led to the government assuming control of the industry, with the responsibility for most (but not all) water works and sewerage systems being passed to local government by the beginning of the 20th century. One of the earliest proponents for the nationalisation of the water supply and sewerage (WSS) system was Joseph Chamberlain, who argued in 1884 that "It is difficult, if not impossible to combine the citizens' rights and interests and the private enterprise's interests, because the private enterprise aims at its natural and justified objective, the biggest possible profit." 

Water was considered a public health necessity—rather than a commodity—and potable water was supplied "with the goal of universal provision [priced] on a concept of social equity: household supply was not metered, and bills were linked to property value." Local government subsequently maintained responsibility for most water supply and all wastewater services—assisted by central government subsidies—until 1974, when the ten regional water authorities (RWAs) were created, through Geoffrey Rippon's Water Act 1973 under Edward Heath's Conservative government.

These regional water authorities took over the supply of water from 165 of the 198 statutory water-supply undertakings, entities that included 64 local authorities, 101 joint water boards of groups of local authorities acting as separate legal entities. The 33 private companies were left in place. Sewerage and sewage disposal had been dealt with by more than 1,300 country borough and county district councils. Daniel A. Okun, an environmental engineer and internationally renowned figure in the field of water supply and water resources management, regarded the RWAs as "pioneers of their era." This "trailblazing" concept of a single authority, based on a river basin or watershed, being responsible for water extraction, water supply, sewage treatment and environmental pollution prevention, led to "considerable efficiency gains." Despite these efficiency gains, the RWAs were hampered by chronic underfunding and lack of investment from central government. Underinvestment in infrastructure combined with sustained water pollution by industry contributed to a continued decline of both river and tap water quality.

By 1980, investment in the water sector was just one-third of what it had been in 1970. Margaret Thatcher's Conservative government, which had been elected in 1979, had curtailed the RWAs ability to borrow money they deemed necessary for capital projects. Daniel Okun said: "Before, they could borrow money everywhere easily. They could get money at very good rates. Restrictions on external borrowing prevented the [RWAs] from getting capital. They were considered ineffective because they could not borrow money. Thatcher prevented them from borrowing and then blamed them for not building." When the European Union introduced stricter legislation on river, bathing, coastal, and drinking water quality, the sector was in no position to meet the expenditure requirements and the UK was prosecuted for noncompliance. Estimates of the capital expenditure required to achieve EU standards and meet the existing backlog in infrastructure maintenance ranged from £24 to £30 billion.

Process
The Conservative government of the day had originally proposed water privatisation in 1984 and again in 1986, but strong public feeling against the proposals led to plans being shelved to prevent the issue influencing the 1987 general election. Having won the election, the privatisation plan was "resurrected and implemented rapidly."

The newly created, privately owned, water and sewerage companies (WSCs) paid £7.6 billion for the regional water authorities. At the same time, the government assumed responsibility for the sector's total debts amounting to £5 billion and granted the WSCs a further £1.5 billion—a so-called "green dowry"—of public funds.

The ten privatised regional water authorities were:
Anglian Water (previously Anglian Water Authority)
Dŵr Cymru Welsh Water (previously Welsh Water Authority)
North West Water (previously North West Water Authority)
Northumbrian Water (previously Northumbrian Water Authority)
Severn Trent Water (previously Severn Trent Water Authority)
Southern Water (previously Southern Water Authority)
South West Water (previously South West Water Authority)
Thames Water (previously Thames Water Authority)
Wessex Water (previously Wessex Water Authority)
Yorkshire Water (previously Yorkshire Water Authority)

The process of privatisation also created three new regulatory bodies: 
the Drinking Water Inspectorate (DWI), responsible for monitoring potable water quality; 
the National Rivers Authority (now the Environment Agency and Natural Resources Wales), responsible for monitoring river and environmental pollution, flood risk management on major rivers, freshwater fisheries, water resource management and conservation of the natural environment; and 
the Water Services Regulation Authority, or Ofwat, responsible for setting the price regime that water companies are required to follow and monitoring performance of the new water companies.

England and Wales became the only countries in the world to have a fully privatised water and sewage disposal system. In Scotland and Northern Ireland, water and sewerage services remained in public ownership. Since 2001, Dŵr Cymru Welsh Water, the company which supplies drinking water and wastewater services to most of Wales and parts of western England, has operated as a single-purpose, not-for-profit company with no shareholders, "run solely for the benefit of customers". According to The Independent, the English WSCs are now mostly owned "by private equity firms with controversial tax-avoidance strategies." Public opinion polling carried out in 2017 indicated that 83% of the British public favoured renationalisation of all water services.

In the same year, research by the University of Greenwich suggested that consumers in England were paying £2.3 billion more every year for their water and sewerage bills than they would if the water companies had remained under state ownership.

Camelford disaster

Campaigners alleged that there was a cover-up of the 1988 Camelford water pollution incident because prosecution would have had a negative effect on the privatisation process. A contemporary confidential memo—later obtained under the Freedom of Information Act—from a senior civil servant to the then Minister of State for the Environment, Michael Howard, warned: "Those of the South West Board with a commercial background are deeply concerned by the investigation. They see the timing of any prosecution of the authority as being totally unhelpful to privatisation, while the prosecution of a board member in their view could render the whole of the water industry unattractive to the City."

In March 2012, delivering a narrative verdict on the death of Camelford resident Carole Cross, Michael Rose, the Coroner for West Somerset, stated that he harboured the "deepest suspicion" that the true nature of the 1988 disaster was "not revealed immediately because the water industry was being privatised," adding that there was a "deliberate policy not to advise the public of the true nature [of the disaster] until some 16 days after the occurrence of the incident."

See also
Water supply and sanitation in England and Wales
Asset management plan period

Notes and references
Notes

References

Bibliography

Further reading

England Wales
Economy of England
Economy of Wales
Public policy in England
Government of Wales
Privatisation in the United Kingdom
Privatisation